The 2022 Croatian Football Super Cup was the thirteenth edition of the Croatian Football Super Cup, a football match contested by the winners of the Croatian First League and Croatian Football Cup. The match was played on 9 July 2022 at Stadion Maksimir in Zagreb between the 2021–22 Croatian First League winners Dinamo Zagreb and the 2021–22 Croatian Football Cup winners Hajduk Split.

Match details 

Dinamo won 4–1 on penalties.

References

External links
 Croatian Football Super Cup at the Croatian Football Federation 

2022
GNK Dinamo Zagreb matches
HNK Hajduk Split matches
Supercup